The 33rd Regiment was a People's Army of Vietnam (PAVN) regiment that served during the Vietnam War.

History
The regiment or elements participated in the famous battles of Ia Drang and Plei Me in the Central Highlands in 1965 against US forces, attacked Buon Me Thuot during the 1968 Tet Offensive, and fought against Australian and New Zealand forces in Phuoc Tuy Province at Binh Ba, Long Khanh  and Nui Le, as well as a number of other actions. In the South, the 33rd Regiment was subordinate to the 304th Division/B3 Front in the Central Highlands, and later under Military Region 7 and the 5th Division in Bien Hoa, Long Khanh and Phuoc Tuy Province, and its strength averaged about 1,300 men.

Elements of the regiment defended the camp killing nine Americans before withdrawing with unknown casualties. Corporal Michael Fleming Folland smothered a PAVN hand grenade with his body and was later posthumously awarded the Medal of Honor. The base comprised over 50 bunkers linked by tunnels. Among the items captured were 200 Rocket-propelled grenades, two 82mm mortars, one 60mm mortar, two AK-47s and 12,000 AK-47 rounds.

A 33rd Regiment memorial near Binh Ba lists 2,100 killed in the war, out of an estimated 4,000 Vietnamese killed in two provinces occupied by forces of the 1st Australian Task Force from 1966 to 1972. Dr Bob Hall, a former infantry officer and Vietnam veteran who heads Operation Wandering Souls that aims to identify all Vietnamese soldiers killed in clashes with 1ATF forces, has so far identified 3,009 burial sites and has passed on the names of over 600 Vietnamese soldiers believed to be buried there.

Notes
Footnotes

Citations

References

Further reading

Military units and formations of the Vietnam War
Regiments of the People's Army of Vietnam